Caroline Michelle Christine Webb (born 1971) is a British author, economist and executive coach. Her book, How to Have a Good Day (Crown Business 2016), argued that insights from behavioural economics, psychology and neuroscience can be used to improve working life. She is a frequent contributor to Harvard Business Review, and has also written on behavioural change topics for Fast Company, Wired UK, Quartz, Business Insider and the World Economic Forum. Her work has been featured widely in the media, including in the Financial Times, The Economist, The New York Times, The Guardian, Time, Inc., Forbes, Business Insider, The Daily Telegraph, BBC Radio and ABC Radio National.

Education
From 1987 to 1989, Webb attended UWC Atlantic College, one of the United World Colleges. She graduated from the University of Cambridge in 1992 with a first class bachelor's degree in economics, and received her MPhil from the University of Oxford in economics in 1997.

Career

From 1992 to 1993, Webb was a research fellow at the Levy Economics Institute. From 1993 to 2000, Webb was an economist at the Bank of England, where her work covered a range of international and domestic public policy issues, including the UK government's support to reforms in central and eastern Europe, and forecasting of the US economy. From 1998 to 2000, she was one of the authors of the Bank of England Inflation Report.

In 2000, Webb joined McKinsey & Company, where she was made a partner in 2008. Her work centred on organisational change and leadership development, including executive coaching.

In 2012, Webb founded Sevenshift, a coaching and consulting firm specialising in increasing workplace performance and well-being through application of insights from behavioural science. She remains an external senior adviser to McKinsey.

In 2017, Webb became a member of the Silicon Guild, a group of thought leaders and best-selling authors who write about the ideas and trends shaping business and society. In 2017, she joined the advisory board of Ethical Systems, a non-profit organisation dedicated to practical applications of research on the value of ethics in business.

How to Have a Good Day

On February 2, 2016, Crown Business (an imprint of Penguin Random House) published How to Have a Good Day: Harness the Power of Behavioral Science to Transform Your Working Life in North America. In the book, Webb explains how to apply findings from the behavioural sciences to daily tasks and routines, to help readers more effectively navigate typical challenges of the modern workplace. How to Have a Good Day has been published in over 60 countries, in a number of English language editions and in several translations, including Brazilian Portuguese, Complex/Traditional Chinese, Dutch, French, Hungarian, Italian, Japanese, Korean, Portuguese, Romanian, and Spanish. It has appeared on a number of "best of" book lists, including those in Forbes, Fortune and Inc. How to Have a Good Day was nominated for the 800-CEO-READ Business Book of the Year. The second UK & Commonwealth edition of the book was published in 2017 by Pan Macmillan under the title How to Have a Good Day: The Essential Toolkit for a Productive Day at Work and Beyond. The first UK & Commonwealth edition was published in 2016 with the title How to Have a Good Day: Think Bigger, Feel Better and Transform Your Working Life.

Personal life
Webb lives in New York with her husband.

References

1971 births
Living people
British economists
British women economists
People educated at Atlantic College